Frank R. Mayo (June 23, 1908 – October 30, 1987) was a research chemist who worked for a variety of companies and won the 1967 Award in Polymer Chemistry from the American Chemical Society due to his work on the Mayo–Lewis equation.

Early life and education
Mayo was born on June 23, 1908 in Chicago, Illinois.

He attended the University of Chicago, receiving his B.S. in chemistry in 1929.  He did his doctoral work at the University of Chicago, receiving his Ph.D. in chemistry in 1931. He studied with Morris S. Kharasch.

Career

For an autobiographical account of the discovery of the peroxide effect see J. Chem. Educ., 63, 97-99(1986) and ref. 1 therein.

Awards and memberships
Mayo was involved in the Division of Polymer Chemistry (POLY) of the American Chemical Society (ACS), and was vice-chair in 1958 and chair in 1959, and also held the role of councilor from 1958 to 1960. CS awarded Mayo the 1967 ACS Award in Polymer Chemistry; and in 1985, he received POLY's Distinguished Service Award.

References

External links
 
 

1908 births
1987 deaths
University of Chicago alumni
University of Chicago faculty
SRI International people